Phytoecia manicata is a species of beetle in the family Cerambycidae. It was described by Reiche and Saulcy in 1858. It is known from Jordan, Syria, Lebanon, Turkey and Palestine.

References

Phytoecia
Beetles described in 1858